Sabz Burj ("Green Dome") is an octagonal tomb situated in Mathura Road, Nizamuddin complex, beside Humayun's Tomb, New Delhi.

It has been conserved and restored over the last four years using traditional materials and building-craft techniques favoured by 16th century craftsmen.

History 
Some Mughal historians consider the Sabz Burj tomb is constructed to be for Fahim Khan, who died in 1626 A.D. He was an attendant to Abdur Rahim Khan during 4th Mughal emperor Jahangir's reign. But others have opined that it was made in 1530–40.

The Archaeological Survey of India (ASI) has renovated the structure. In 2018, the Aga Khan Trust for Culture (AKTC) discovered original 16th century paintings on the ceiling. It requested the ASI to remove cement and tiles from the 1986 restoration in order to restore the original lime that covered it. Complete restoration by the AKTC should be completed by 2020. Now it is ASI protected monument.

Architecture 
Its exterior is covered in blue tiles (although subz means "green") and stone. The structure is crowned with a blue dome and it is popularly known as the Neeli ("Blue") chhatri. The construction was influenced by Central Asian architecture, which consists of alternating wide and narrow sides. Entrances have been built into the wider sides, while the narrower sides are ornamented in a pattern of incised plaster, paint or glazed tile.

The tomb does not have any markings pointing to the identity of those buried under it. However, it is of immense significance due to the ceiling on its double dome structure painted in pure gold and lapiz and revealed after conservation efforts began. It is thought to be the earliest surviving painted ceiling for any monument in India.

References

External links

World Heritage Sites in India
Indo-Islamic architecture
Mughal architecture
Sandstone buildings in India
Tourist attractions in Delhi
Monuments and memorials in Delhi